Ashurst Lake is a small lake located on the Anderson Mesa  southeast of Flagstaff.  It is one of the few natural lakes in the state of Arizona, the bulk of which reside in the area.

Unlike similarly sized lakes in the North Central Arizona region, Ashurst is fed by more reliable springs and has a reputation for retaining water even during long dry periods.  The lake is regularly stocked with rainbow trout and thus a common destination for local anglers. Ashurst Lake is also considered a favorable fishing location for Northern Pike. The facilities are maintained under the authority of the Coconino National Forest.

The lake has two campgrounds, Ashurst Lake on the west shore and Forked Pine on the east shore.

Fish species
 Rainbow Trout
 Brook Trout

References

External links
 HookedAZ Fishing Community | Ashurst Lake
 Arizona Boating Locations Facilities Map
 Arizona Fishing Locations Map
 Video of Ashurst Lake

Lakes of Arizona
Lakes of Coconino County, Arizona
Coconino National Forest